The Open Exoplanet Catalogue is a catalogue of all discovered extra-solar planets. It is a new kind of astronomical database decentralized and completely open.

It is considered one of the four exoplanet catalogues most widely used, together with the Extrasolar Planets Encyclopaedia, the NASA Exoplanet Archive, and the Exoplanet Data Explorer.

In 2012, Hanno Rein presented a new kind of astronomical database based on small text files and a distributed version control system.

In 2016, Ryan Varley presented ExoData, Python interface and exploratory analysis tool for the Open Exoplanet Catalogue.

Statistics 
As of October 2020, the Open Exoplanet Catalogue has the following statistics:

References 

Exoplanet catalogues